Tubokosemie Aberei (born 18 August 1950) is a retired Anglican bishop in Nigeria: he was the Bishop of Okrika, one of nine in the Anglican Province of the Niger Delta, itself one of fourteen within the Church of Nigeria.

He was consecrated as the pioneer Bishop of Okrika at St. Cyprian's Church, Port Harcourt on 16 November 2003 and enthroned in 2004. He retired in 2020.

Notes

Anglican bishops of Okrika
21st-century Anglican bishops in Nigeria
1950 births
Living people